Homohypochaeta is a genus of parasitic flies in the family Tachinidae.

Species
Homohypochaeta reclinata Townsend, 1927
Homohypochaeta ucayali (Townsend, 1929)

References

Dexiinae
Tachinidae genera
Diptera of South America
Taxa named by Charles Henry Tyler Townsend